Someday This Pain Will Be Useful to You is a young adult novel by Peter Cameron. James Sveck, the protagonist, tells the reader about his life, including the reasons he became a "Missing Misfit" and is seeing a psychiatrist.

Plot
James Sveck, 18, is an isolated young adult caught in the summer before he is to begin college at Brown University. The only person in his life with whom he is able to successfully relate is his grandmother; otherwise, James prefers solitude. Cameron's use of first person narration allows for the reader to create an intimate relationship with James as he works through his life and through the therapy sessions to which his parents have made him go. The reader learns about James’ present as he tells the events of his days, but the reader learns about his past when James reflects on his therapy sessions.

Characters
James Sveck - 18 years old; lives with his mother; emotionally close to his grandmother
Gillian Sveck - James's older sister; going into her fourth year at Barnard College; dating Rainer Maria Schultz
Paul Sveck - James father; questions James about his sexuality
Marjorie Dunfour - James' mother; owns gallery and is divorced from Paul Sveck (169)
Rainer Maria Schultz - language theory professor at Barnard College
Barry Rogers - the man whom James's mother marries but she returns from the honeymoon in Las Vegas without him after he steals her credit card to use for gambling
John Webster - works for James's mother at the art gallery (10); grew up in Georgia; went to Harvard (23)
Dr. Rowena Adler - James' psychiatrist (65)
Miro - the family dog; black standard poodle; James feels the family talks more often to the dog than each other (15)

Reception

Awards and recognition
 American Library Association (ALA) Best Books for Young Adults 2008
 Amazon.com Top 10 Editor's Picks
 Starred reviews in Booklist, Hornbook, and Kirkus Reviews
 Ferro-Grumley Award for Gay Male Fiction 2008

Film
In 2012, Jean Vigo Italia and Four of a Kind Productions released a film based on the book, directed by Roberto Faenza and starring Toby Regbo. Marcia Gay Harden stars as James' mother, Peter Gallagher plays his father and Ellen Burstyn plays his grandmother.

Title
The title alludes to a line from the Amores by the  Roman poet Ovid, "Perfer et obdura, dolor hic tibi proderit olim. (Be patient and tough; someday this pain will be useful to you.)"

References

2007 American novels
American novels adapted into films
American young adult novels
2000s LGBT literature
American LGBT novels
LGBT-related young adult novels